The Official New Zealand Music Chart is the weekly New Zealand top 40 singles and albums charts, issued weekly by Recorded Music NZ (formerly Recording Industry Association of New Zealand). The Music Chart also includes the top-20 New Zealand artist singles and albums and top 10 compilation albums. All charts are compiled from data of both physical and digital sales from music retailers in New Zealand.

Methodology
The singles chart is currently sales and streaming data of songs. In June 2014 it was announced that the chart would also include streaming; this took effect for the chart published 7 November 2014 and dated 10 November 2014. Previously airplay was factored into the chart methodology as well.

History 
Before 1975, music charts in New Zealand had been regionally compiled by magazines, record stores, and radio stations on an ad hoc basis. This often occurred at different times which made chart compiling complex, and even then only singles were counted.

From May 1975 to 2004, RIANZ also published an nationwide annual ranking chart of singles and albums released in New Zealand. Position was awarded by a simple scoring system whereby a number one in one week gets 50 points, a number two gets 49 points and so on, then all weeks are added together. From 2004 onwards, however, the annual charts have songs positioned based on the number of sales for that year.

From April 2007 to October 2011, the charts were displayed and archived at the website radioscope.net.nz which listed 13 different charts, most notably RadioScope100 and NZ40 Airplay Chart. In November 2011, RIANZ launched an updated chart website. The new Chart website also provides the ability to listen to song previews, view music videos, and buy tracks and albums.

On 19 June 2021, a new chart was launched for the top ten songs in te reo Māori, for songs with at least 70% of vocals in Māori.

40th anniversary 

In May 2015, Recorded Music NZ celebrated the 40th anniversary of the  Official NZ Top 40 Music Charts. An event was held at Vector Arena in Auckland and featured performances from 16 artists from New Zealand and overseas who had previously achieved various chart milestones, including most number ones, most chart entries, most weeks in the chart and most weeks at number one.

As part of the celebrations, a limited edition single pressed on red vinyl was released, with Tiki Taane's song "Always on my Mind" (the New Zealand track to spend the most weeks - 55 - in the singles chart) and Scribe's song "Stand Up" (the New Zealand single to spend the most weeks - 12 - at number one).

The following chart achievements were noted:

 Singles

 Most no.1 singles: The Beatles have fourteen as a band, Justin Bieber with eleven and Katy Perry with nine no.1 singles respectively
 Most no.1 singles (NZ): Deep Obsession, 3 no. 1 singles
 Most chart entries: Madonna, 53 entries
 Most chart entries (NZ): Shihad, 25 entries
 Most weeks in chart: New Order "Blue Monday", 74 weeks
 Most weeks in chart (NZ): Tiki Taane "Always On My Mind", 55 weeks

 Albums

 Most No.1 albums: U2, 13 no.1 albums
 Most No.1 albums (NZ): Local Act: Hayley Westenra, and Shihad, five no.1 albums each
 Most chart entries: Elton John, 35 entries
 Most chart entries (NZ): Split Enz, 14 entries
 Most weeks in chart: Pink Floyd Dark Side of the Moon, 297 weeks
 Most weeks in chart (NZ): Fat Freddy's Drop Based on a True Story, 108 weeks
 Most weeks at no.1: Adele 21, 28 weeks
 Most weeks at no.1 (NZ): Hayley Westenra Pure, 19 weeks

Certifications

From June 2016, the method of determining certifications was changed to a points-based system based on a combination of physical sales, digital sales and online streams. For singles, 175 streams is considered equal to one sale. For albums, the Stream Equivalent Album (SEA) system is used.

A single qualifies for gold certification if it exceeds 15,000 points and platinum certification if it exceeds 30,000 points. An album qualifies for gold certification if it exceeds 7500 points and platinum certification if it exceeds 15,000 points. wholesale sales to retailers. For music DVDs (formerly videos), a gold accreditation represents 2,500 copies shipped, with a platinum accreditation representing 5,000 units shipped.

Chart records

Artists with the most number-one hits 

These totals include singles when the artist is 'featured'—that is, not the main artist.

 –  The Beatles' 14 chart placings predate the Official New Zealand Music Chart which began in May 1975.

New Zealand artists with the most number-one hits 

These totals includes singles when the artist is 'featured'—that is, not the main artist.

 – includes duet or collaboration by two New Zealand artists.
 –  includes songs whose chart placings predate the Official New Zealand Music Chart which began in May 1975.

Singles with most weeks at number one

Key
 – Song of New Zealand origin
 Songs denoted with an asterisk (*) spent non-consecutive weeks at number one

List of certified albums
The following is a list of albums that have been certified by the Recorded Music NZ.

Gold

?
The 20/20 Experience
4
5 Seconds of Summer
12 Memories
A Girl Like Me
All for You
All Hope Is Gone
All You Can Eat
Alright, Still
Always Guaranteed
Animal
As Time Goes By
Awake
Beautiful Garbage
Begin to Hope
Believe
Best 1991–2004
The Best Damn Thing
Binaural
Birdy
Black Holes and Revelations
Blackout
Blackstar
Blink-182
Blue & Lonesome
Borrowed Heaven
Britney
Cats & Dogs
Celebration
Changes
Closer
Coldplay Live 2003
Communiqué
The Collector's Series, Volume One
Control
Danger Days: The True Lives of the Fabulous Killjoys
Dark Sky Island
Darkness on the Edge of Town
Days of the New
Debut
D'eux
Delta
Devils & Dust
Divinely Uninspired to a Hellish Extent
Dizzy Up the Girl
DNA
Dutty Rock
EIpo: The Very Best
Enjoy Yourself
The Celts
Evermore
Evil Empire
Exile on Main St.
Expectations
The Fall
Folklore
Forever
Freak of Nature
Future Nostalgia
Get Rich or Die Tryin'
Ghost Stories
The Globe Sessions
Grassy Knoll
Greatest Hits: My Prerogative
Greatest Hits
Green
GHV2
Harry Styles
Happy Nation
Hardwired... to Self-Destruct
Here and Now
Hey U X
High Hopes
Hook Me Up
Hooray for Boobies
Hope
Hot Pink
How Big, How Blue, How Beautiful
Human Being
Human Frailty
Human Touch
The Id
Illuminations
In the Zone
The Invisible Band
Is This It
It Won't Be Soon Before Long
Ixnay on the Hombre
J to tha L–O! The Remixes
Janet Jackson's Rhythm Nation 1814
Josh Groban
Joyride
Kid A
Leather Jackets
Lemonade
Life Is Peachy
Light Grenades
Live/1975–85
Live from Mars
The Long Road
The Lord of the Rings: The Fellowship of the Ring
Love Deluxe
Lovers Rock
Lucky Town
Lungs
Machina/The Machines of God
Made in the AM
Magic
The Man Who
MCMXC a.D.
More Songs About Buildings and Food
Music of the Sun
My Love: Essential Collection
The Next Day
Night Visions
Nine Track Mind
Nobody But Me
Not Too Late
On the 6
One of the Boys
Out of Time
Overexposed
Passive Me, Aggressive You
Pilgrim
Popstars
Post
Quiet Nights
Reveal
Room on Fire
Safe Trip Home
Seal
The Secret Life Of...
Secrets
Sheryl Crow
Silver Side Up
Six Strings and a Sailboat
So Good
Sparkle in the Rain
Stella & Steve
Storm Front
Storyteller – The Complete Anthology: 1964–1990
Stronger
Stronger Than Pride
Submarine Bells
Suicide Squad
Surfacing
Taking Chances
Telling Stories
This Is Me... Then
Three Cheers for Sweet Revenge
Try This
The Turn of a Friendly Card
Ultimate Prince
Unapologetic
Under My Skin
Undertow
Unplugged
Untouchables
Up
V
Vol. 3: (The Subliminal Verses)
Wish
You Want It Darker
Zeitgeist
Zoot Suit Riot
Love Yourself: Answer

Platinum

5
13
18
52nd Street
8701
A Crow Left of the Murder...
A Day Without Rain
A Head Full of Dreams
Adore
Affirmation
All Saints
Amarantine
...And Justice for All
And Winter Came...
Automatic for the People
Avalon
B'Day
Bardot
The Battle of Los Angeles
Be Here Now
The Bends
The Best of Sade
Beyoncé
The Black Parade
Bloody Tourists
Blurryface
Born This Way
Born to Die
Born to Die: The Paradise Edition
Born to Run
Brand New Day
Breathless
Broken English
...But Seriously
Butterfly
Can't Take Me Home
Ceremonials
Chinese Democracy
Circus
Collection
Confessions on a Dance Floor
Crossroads
The Dance
Dangerously In Love
Dark Horse
Death Magnetic
Definitely Maybe
Design of a Decade: 1986–1996
Diamond Life
Dire Straits
Don't Ask
Don't Bore Us, Get to the Chorus!
Double Fantasy
The Dutchess
Elephant
The Emancipation of Mimi
Emotions
The Endless River
Ænima
Enrique
Escape
The Essential Leonard Cohen
The Essential Ozzy Osbourne
Europop
Every Breath You Take:The Singles
Evita
Eye in the Sky
Faith
Feels So Good
The Final Cut
Fire on Marzz
Flesh and Blood
Follow the Leader
Foot Loose & Fancy Free
For Your Entertainment
Folklore
Forgiven, Not Forgotten
Four
From the Cradle
Garage Inc.
Ghost in the Machine
The Girl in the Other Room
Glittering Prize 81/92
Good Girl Gone Bad
Greatest Hits
Greatest Hits
Greatest Hits
Greatest Hits
The Greatest Hits
Greatest Hits, Vol. 1
Halcyon Days
Heart of Stone
Hello Nasty
HIStory: Past, Present and Future, Book I
The Hits/The B-Sides
Home for Christmas
Hot August Night
Hot Fuss
Hypnotize
Hysteria
I Do Not Want What I Haven't Got
Ice on Fire
Ingénue
Issues
It's Not Me, It's You
Jagged Little Pill
janet.
The John Lennon Collection
Justice
Justified
The Kick Inside
Korn
Kylie
Left of the Middle
The Lexicon of Love
Little Creatures
Load
The Look of Love
Look Sharp!
Loud
Love Hurts
Love over Gold
Lover
Madonna
Make Yourself
Making Movies
Master of Puppets
Meant to Be
Mellon Collie and the Infinite Sadness
Mezmerize
Midnight Memories
Mistaken Identity
The Memory of Trees
MTV Unplugged in New York
Nebraska
Need You Now
New Beginning
New Gold Dream (81–82–83–84)
New Jersey
No Line on the Horizon
No Need to Argue
No Strings Attached
Now You're Gone – The Album
OK Computer
Odelay
On Every Street
Once Upon a Time
The One
One Heart
Out of the Moon
Paint the Sky with Stars
Prayers Be Answered
Private Collection: 1979–1988
Promise
Promises and Lies
Rage Against the Machine
Rainbow
Random Access Memories
Read My Lips
Reckless
Recurring Dream: The Very Best of Crowded House
Red Pill Blues
Reggatta de Blanc
Relapse
Revenge
Riding with the King
The Rising
River of Dreams
Rubber Soul
Seal II
The Score
See You on the Other Side
Sex and Agriculture: The Very Best of The Exponents
She
She's So Unusual
Shepherd Moons
Siamese Dream
The Singles 1992–2003
Six60 (2)
Slash
Slippery When Wet
Smash
So
So Far So Good
Someone to Watch Over Me
Something to Remember
Songs from the Last Century
"The Spaghetti Incident?"
Space Race
Speak Now
Speaking in Tongues
Spirit
Spirit
Standing Ovation: The Greatest Songs from the Stage
Staying at Tamara's
Step by Step
Stop Making Sense
The Stranger
The Sweet Escape
Synchronicity
Talk That Talk
Tapestry
Tea for the Tillerman
Ten Good Reasons
Title
Toni Braxton
Touch
Toxicity
Traction
Tracy Chapman
Trash
True Stories
Truly Madly Completely: The Best of Savage Garden
Tuesday Night Music Club
Tunnel of Love
The Ultimate Collection
Ultimate Prince
Undiscovered
The Unforgettable Fire
Unplugged
Use Your Illusion I
Use Your Illusion II
The Velvet Rope
Version 2.0
The Very Best of Enya
The Very Best of Elton John
The Very Best of Prince
Vitalogy
Vows
Vs.
Wanted on Voyage
Wasting Light
Watermark
Welcome to the Pleasuredome
Weezer (Blue Album)
(What's the Story) Morning Glory?
Whitesnake
#willpower
You Can Dance
Zenyatta Mondatta

Multi platinum

Two times

10,000 Days
19
A New Day Has Come
A Star Is Born (2018 soundtrack)
All Rise
B*Witched
The Beatles
Beautiful Trauma
Believe
Best of The Corrs
Break the Cycle
Communicate 
Don't Smile at Me
Dream
Dua Lipa
El Camino
Enema of the State
The Essential Michael Jackson
Evolve
Fine Line
Fever
Garbage
Gravel & Wine
I'm Not Dead
I Am... Sasha Fierce
J.Lo
Lateralus
Like a Prayer
Loose
Love. Angel. Music. Baby.
Melodrama
Merry Christmas
Merry Christmas, Baby
Morning View
MTV Unplugged
Music
My World 2.0
Mylo Xyloto
Navigator
Oops!... I Did It Again
On Another Note
Parachutes
Pop
Prism
Purpose
?
Ray of Light
Red
The River
S&M
Savage Garden
Significant Other
St. Anger
Surrender
Switch
Take Me Home
These Are Special Times
The Thrill of It All
Viva la Vida or Death and All His Friends
War
Whoa, Nelly!
#1's

Three times

24K Magic
Audioslave
...Baby One More Time
Back to Black
Breakaway
Crazy Hits
ELV1S: 30 No. 1 Hits
Fearless
Feels Like Home
Funhouse
FutureSex/LoveSounds
Greatest Hits
Greatest Hits
Greatest Hits... So Far!!!
Hits
In Utero
Innocent Eyes
Laundry Service
Love & Disrespect
Made in Heaven
Middle of Nowhere
The Miseducation of Lauryn Hill
Not That Kind
Reputation
Riverhead
Rockferry
Something Beginning With C
Spiceworld
Still Waters
Teenage Dream
Unorthodox Jukebox
Up!
Up All Night
Westlife
When We All Fall Asleep, Where Do We Go?

Four times

All The Right Reasons
Americana
The Best of 1990–2000
Coast to Coast
Best of '98-'08
Playground Battle
The Gift
Greatest Hits
Greatest Hits: 1965–1992
Holy Smoke
Hot Shot
Icehouse
In Blue
In The Lonely Hour
Ladies & Gentlemen: The Best of George Michael
Life for Rent
Mariah Carey
Missundaztood
On How Life Is
A Rush of Blood to the Head
The Truth About Love
Wish You Were Here
X&Y
You've Come a Long Way, Baby
Zooropa

Five times

+
Abbey Road
Achtung Baby
All the Way... A Decade of Song
Appetite for Destruction
Chocolate Starfish and the Hot Dog Flavored Water
Crowded House
Daydream
Fallen
The Fame
Hybrid Theory
Let Go
Like a Virgin
Mix
Music Box
No Angel
Once Bitten, Twice Bitten
The Party Album
Pieces of You
The Platinum Album
Pure Heroine
Purple Rain
Songs About Jane
Supersystem
Tragic Kingdom
True Blue
Union
Urban Hymns

Six times
1989
The Best of Van Morrison
The Colour of My Love
Doo-Wops & Hooligans
Greatest Hits
Sgt. Pepper's Lonely Hearts Club Band
Talk on Corners
Ten
Tuesday Night Music Club

Seven times
Cross Road
Drive
The Immaculate Collection
Nevermind
Play
Sing When You're Winning
Spice

Eight times
Californication
Ricky Martin
SOL3 MIO
Their Greatest Hits: The Record
x

Nine times
25
Bad
Based on a True Story
The Best of 1980–1990
The Ego Has Landed
The Eminem Show
Hotel California
Let's Talk About Love 	
Recurring Dream

Ten times
Beautiful Collision
Metallica

Eleven times
Come Away with Me
Greatest Hits
I Dreamed a Dream

Twelve times
Christmas
Falling into You
The Phantom of the Opera (1986 musical)
Pure
Thriller

Thirteen times
÷
21
Rumours

Fourteen times
The Joshua Tree
The Wall

Fifteen times
1

Sixteen times
The Dark Side of the Moon
Gold: Greatest Hits

Seventeen times
Bat Out of Hell
Born in the U.S.A.

Twenty times
Legend

Twenty one times
Come On Over

Twenty four times
Brothers in Arms

See also 
 List of number-one singles in New Zealand by New Zealand artists
 List of number-one albums in New Zealand by New Zealand artists
 List of best-selling albums in New Zealand

References

Bibliography

External links
Official New Zealand Music Chart Website
New Zealand Charts portal and archive

New Zealand record charts